Agriphila cernyi is a moth in the family Crambidae. It was described by Julius Ganev in 1985. It is found in Mongolia.

References

Crambini
Moths described in 1985
Moths of Asia